Paradise Hill is a village in the Canadian province of Saskatchewan within the Rural Municipality of Frenchman Butte No. 501 and Census Division No. 17.

The school offers grades from K to 12.

Oil, natural gas and farming are the primary providers for the economy.

History 
Paradise Hill incorporated as a village on January 1, 1947.

Demographics 

Attractions
The Roman Catholic church of Our Lady of Sorrows in Paradise Hill was decorated by the artist Berthold Imhoff.

A giant ox and cart at the entrance of the village commemorates the Carlton Trail.

The Marsh north and west of the village with its walkways, paths and lookout offers bird watching opportunities.

The Frenchman Butte Museum, the Battle of Frenchman Butte National Historic Site and Fort Pitt Provincial Park are all located within 15 to 30 minute driving distance.

Notable people 
John Rogers, played NHL for the Minnesota North Stars and in the WHA for the Edmonton Oilers
Tanner Novlan (born 9 April 1986) is an actor and model. He is best known for starring as "Struggling Actor" in a Liberty Mutual commercial (2019), as Gregory Manes on The CW's Roswell, New Mexico (2020–2021), and currently, for playing Dr. John "Finn" Finnegan in the American CBS soap opera The Bold and the Beautiful (2020–present) and guest roles on many TV shows, most notably Parenthood, Letterkenny and Modern Family.

See also 
 List of communities in Saskatchewan
 Villages of Saskatchewan
 Paradise Hill Airport

References

External links 

Villages in Saskatchewan
Frenchman Butte No. 501, Saskatchewan
Division No. 17, Saskatchewan